In science, a null result is a result without the expected content: that is, the proposed result is absent. It is an experimental outcome which does not show an otherwise expected effect. This does not imply a result of zero or nothing, simply a result that does not support the hypothesis. 

In statistical hypothesis testing, a null result occurs when an experimental result is not significantly different from what is to be expected under the null hypothesis; its probability (under the null hypothesis) does not exceed the significance level, i.e., the threshold set prior to testing for rejection of the null hypothesis. The significance level varies, but common choices include 0.10, 0.05, and 0.01.

As an example in physics, the results of the Michelson–Morley experiment were of this type, as it did not detect the expected velocity relative to the postulated luminiferous aether. This experiment's famous failed detection, commonly referred to as the null result, contributed to the development of special relativity. The experiment did appear to measure a non-zero "drift", but the value was far too small to account for the theoretically expected results; it is generally thought to be inside the noise level of the experiment.

Scientific journals for null results
There are now several scientific journals dedicated to the publication of negative or null results, including the following:
 Journal of Negative Results in Biomedicine (defunct)
 Journal of Pharmaceutical Negative Results
 Journal of Unsolved Questions

While it is not exclusively dedicated to publishing negative results, BMC Research Notes also publishes negative results in the form of research or data notes.

See also
Aether theories
Imponderable fluid
 Noise (electronics)
Publication bias

References

Design of experiments
Logic and statistics